Gallipolis Township is one of the fifteen townships of Gallia County, Ohio, United States.  As of the 2010 census the population was 5,097, down from 5,707 at the 2000 census. In 2010, 3,641 township residents lived within the city of Gallipolis, while 1,456 lived in the unincorporated portions of the township.

Geography
Located in the eastern part of the county along the Ohio River, it borders the following townships:
Addison Township - north
Clay Township - south
Green Township - west
Springfield Township - northwest corner

Mason County, West Virginia, lies across the Ohio River to the southeast.

It is located midway between the county's five other Ohio River townships.

The city of Gallipolis, the county seat and largest municipality of Gallia County, occupies most of southern and eastern Gallipolis Township.

Name and history
It is the only Gallipolis Township statewide. The name Gallipolis combines Latin and Greek words meaning "French city".

Government
The township is governed by a three-member board of trustees, who are elected in November of odd-numbered years to a four-year term beginning on the following January 1. Two are elected in the year after the presidential election and one is elected in the year before it. There is also an elected township fiscal officer, who serves a four-year term beginning on April 1 of the year after the election, which is held in November of the year before the presidential election. Vacancies in the fiscal officership or on the board of trustees are filled by the remaining trustees.

References

External links
County website

Townships in Gallia County, Ohio
Townships in Ohio